The Palestine Lodge is a Masonic lodge building in southeast Portland, Oregon listed on the National Register of Historic Places.

See also
 National Register of Historic Places listings in Southeast Portland, Oregon

References

Further reading

External links
 

Masonic buildings in Oregon
1926 establishments in Oregon
Beaux-Arts architecture in Oregon
Buildings and structures completed in 1926
Clubhouses on the National Register of Historic Places in Oregon
National Register of Historic Places in Portland, Oregon
Foster-Powell, Portland, Oregon